Reinaldo José Zacarias da Silva (born 25 May 1984 in São Paulo) is a Brazilian footballer who plays for Concórdia.

Career 
He signed his first professional contract with Siena in 2003.

He joined the Romanian side Universitatea Cluj in February 2010.

References

External links
 CBF
 
 Reinaldo at ZeroZero

Living people
Footballers from São Paulo
Expatriate footballers in Argentina
Expatriate footballers in Portugal
Expatriate footballers in Norway
Expatriate footballers in Romania
Brazilian footballers
Brazilian expatriate footballers
Association football midfielders
1984 births
Association football forwards
Primeira Liga players
Argentine Primera División players
Campeonato Brasileiro Série A players
Campeonato Brasileiro Série B players
Allsvenskan players
Liga I players
Campeonato Brasileiro Série D players
Quilmes Atlético Club footballers
Sociedade Esportiva Palmeiras players
América Futebol Clube (RN) players
C.D. Nacional players
Kalmar FF players
FC Universitatea Cluj players
ABC Futebol Clube players
Clube Atlético Bragantino players
Al-Faisaly FC players
Alecrim Futebol Clube players
Clube Esportivo Lajeadense players
Esporte Clube São José players
Sociedade Esportiva e Recreativa Caxias do Sul players
Esporte Clube Pelotas players
Globo Futebol Clube players
Saudi Professional League players